Allosauridae is a family of medium to large bipedal, carnivorous allosauroid theropod dinosaurs from the Late Jurassic. Allosauridae is a fairly old taxonomic group, having been first named by the American paleontologist Othniel Charles Marsh in 1878. Allosaurids are characterized by an astragalus with a restriction of the ascending process to the lateral part of the bone, a larger medial than lateral condyle, and a horizontal groove across the face of the condyles.

Description 
Allosaurids have a general anatomy typical of other neotheropod dinosaurs, contributing to the difficulty in defining the family's membership. A typical 8m specimen of Allosaurus fragilis had a skull of about 0.85m. The premaxilla has five teeth and the maxilla usually around 16. The dentary also typically has 16 teeth. All teeth are serrated and continuously replaced throughout the life of the animal. Allosaurid skulls are characterized by two sets of crests formed by the nasal and lacrimal bones respectively. These crests would have been covered by keratin sheathes. The skull also exhibits features consistent with significant cranial kinesis: a synovial joint between the braincase and the frontals and a loose articulation between the dentary and the angular/surangular. This cranial kinesis would have dampened forces on the bones of the skull and allowed allosaurids to open their mouths to very large angles.

Allosaurids have 28 precaudal vertebrae (9 cervical, 14 dorsal, 5 sacral) and an estimated 45–50 caudal vertebrae. Gastralia and furculae are rarely preserved as fossils but are presumed to occur in all allosaurids. The pubis is highly elongated and extends ventrally to form a pubic foot which like in other large dinosaurs is thought to have been used to support the weight of the body in a resting crouch position.

Like most other theropods, allosaurids have very short forelimbs relative to their hindlimbs with three digits on the hand and four on the foot. The first digit of the hand forms a semi-opposable thumb and digits 4 and 5 are absent. Digits 2–4 of the foot are robust but digit 1 is reduced and does not touch the ground and digit 5 is absent. All distal phalanges were capped with large claws, those on the hand were especially long and were curved to facilitate raking and grasping of prey items. Phalangeal formulae of the hand and foot are 4-3-4 and 2-3-4-5 respectively.

Classification
In 2019, Rauhut and Pol described Asfaltovenator vialidadi, a basal allosauroid displaying a mosaic of primitive and derived features seen within Tetanurae. Their phylogenetic analysis found traditional Megalosauroidea to represent a basal grade of carnosaurs, paraphyletic with respect to Allosauroidea.

References

External links

 
Kimmeridgian first appearances
Late Jurassic extinctions
Taxa named by Othniel Charles Marsh
Prehistoric dinosaur families